Brookdale is a census-designated place (CDP) in Orangeburg County, South Carolina, United States. The population was 4,724 at the 2000 census.

Geography
Brookdale is located at  (33.511971, -80.836058).

Demographics

As of the census of 2000, there were 4,724 people, 1,901 households, and 1,239 families residing in the CDP. The population density was 1,298.3 people per square mile (501.1/km2). There were 2,325 housing units at an average density of 639.0/sq mi (246.6/km2). The racial makeup of the CDP was 98.05% African American, 0.95% White,  0.17% Native American, 0.08% Asian, 0.02% Pacific Islander, 0.21% from other races, and 0.51% from two or more races. Hispanic or Latino of any race were 0.64% of the population.

There were 1,901 households, out of which 29.7% had children under the age of 18 living with them, 25.7% were married couples living together, 33.4% had a female householder with no husband present, and 34.8% were non-families. 29.9% of all households were made up of individuals, and 12.7% had someone living alone who was 65 years of age or older. The average household size was 2.49 and the average family size was 3.08.

In the CDP, the population was spread out, with 28.0% under the age of 18, 13.0% from 18 to 24, 22.0% from 25 to 44, 21.9% from 45 to 64, and 15.2% who were 65 years of age or older. The median age was 33 years. For every 100 females, there were 83.9 males. For every 100 females age 18 and over, there were 73.2 males.

The median income for a household in the CDP was $21,984, and the median income for a family was $27,128. Males had a median income of $25,857 versus $20,000 for females. The per capita income for the CDP was $12,852. About 28.9% of families and 32.4% of the population were below the poverty line, including 44.7% of those under age 18 and 29.1% of those age 65 or over.

References

Census-designated places in Orangeburg County, South Carolina
Census-designated places in South Carolina